Marzena Zięba is a Polish Paralympic powerlifter. She represented Poland at the Summer Paralympics in 2008, 2012, 2016 and 2021. She won the silver medal in the women's +86 kg event in 2016 and the bronze medal in this event in 2021.

At the 2019 World Championships held in Nur-Sultan, Kazakhstan, she finished in 5th place in the women's +86 kg event.

References

External links 
 

1990 births
Living people
People from Tarnów County
Polish powerlifters
Paralympic powerlifters of Poland
Powerlifters at the 2008 Summer Paralympics
Powerlifters at the 2012 Summer Paralympics
Powerlifters at the 2016 Summer Paralympics
Powerlifters at the 2020 Summer Paralympics
Medalists at the 2016 Summer Paralympics
Medalists at the 2020 Summer Paralympics
Paralympic silver medalists for Poland
Paralympic bronze medalists for Poland
Paralympic medalists in powerlifting
21st-century Polish women